Michael Löwy (born 6 May 1938) is a French-Brazilian Marxist sociologist and philosopher. He is emeritus research director in social sciences at the CNRS (French National Center of Scientific Research)  and lectures at the École des hautes études en sciences sociales (EHESS; Paris, France).  Author of books on Karl Marx, Che Guevara, Liberation Theology, György Lukács, Walter Benjamin, Lucien Goldmann and Franz Kafka, he received the CNRS Silver Medal in 1994.

Academic career
A descendant of Jewish immigrants from Vienna, Löwy grew up in São Paulo, Brazil, becoming a committed socialist at 16 (1954), when he discovered the writings of Rosa Luxemburg. He studied at the University of São Paulo, where he studied under Fernando Henrique Cardoso, Florestan Fernandes and Antônio Cândido); he got his license in Social Sciences in 1960 and lectured in sociology for a year at the University of São José do Rio Preto (State of São Paulo).

In 1961 he received a scholarship for a doctorate in Paris, France, which he did under the guidance of the well-known Marxist philosopher and sociologist of culture Lucien Goldmann, who had a lasting influence on his views. He received his PhD in 1964, with a thesis on "The Young Marx’s Theory of Revolution", at the Sorbonne.

Soon afterwards Löwy went to Israel where his family had migrated. He learned Hebrew and became a lecturer in political philosophy at the University of Tel Aviv, but his political views led to problems, and the University refused to renew his contract in 1968. He was invited - in an act of  solidarity - to lecture at the University of Manchester, where he became assistant to the sociologist and founder of the New Left, Peter Worsley (1968–1969).

In 1969 Löwy returned to Paris to work with Nicos Poulantzas at the University of Paris VIII (Vincennes), and from that moment on established himself definitively in France. In the 1970s he worked, under the direction of Louis-Vincent Thomas, on his Habilitation (doctorat d’état) on György Lukács, presented in 1975 at the University of Paris V (Descartes), and graduated with honours. Löwy lectured in sociology at the University of Paris VIII till 1978 when he was admitted as a researcher at the CNRS.

In 1981 Löwy began also to lecture at the prestigious École des hautes études en sciences sociales (EHESS) in París;  he has also been invited to lecture at Stanford University, UC Berkeley, University of Michigan at Ann Arbor, Columbia University and Harvard University, as well as other US Universities. In 1994 he received the CNRS Silver Medal.

He is emeritus research director in social sciences at the CNRS and teaches at the EHESS. He is member of the editorial board of the journals Archives de sciences sociales des religions, Actuel Marx, ContreTemps  and Écologie et politique, as well as a fellow and regular lecturer at the International Institute for Research and Education in Amsterdam.

Scientific interests

Until 1985 most of Löwy's works concerned the sociological and historical study of Marxist thought. This applies not only to his doctorate on the young Marx and his Habilitation on György Lukács, but to most of the essays which he published, some of which were collected in books, as well as for two anthologies, on the National Question  (with Georges Haupt and Claudie Weill) and on Marxism in Latin America. Marxist epistemology also takes a central place in his work on sociology of knowledge from 1985.

The methodological orientation of his research was inspired by Lucien Goldmann's writings -particularly The Hidden God, 1955)- whose approach,  associating sociology and history, heterodox Marxism and German sociology, the internal study of cultural works and their connexion to the social structure, served him as starting point.

From the mid 1980s Löwy became interested in the Central European Jewish Culture, in Romantic anticapitalism and on the complex interrelations between religion and politics, particularly in Latin America. The concept of elective affinity, borrowed from Max Weber, but re-interpreted, became one of the key methodological tools of his  research. His latest books concern Walter Benjamin’s Theses on the Philosophy of History (1940), which Löwy considers as one of the most important documents of revolutionary thinking since Marx’s Theses on Feuerbach; and Franz Kafka as an anti-authoritarian author, with Anarchist sympathies, whose novels are inspired by a sort of "religion of liberty".

In spite of the diversity of its thematic contents, most of Michael Löwy writings, since his PhD on Marx till now, belong to a sociology of culture, of Marxist/historicist orientation. Inspired by Lukács and Lucien Goldmann, they also refer to the great tradition of German sociology, from Weber to Karl Mannheim. Their aim is to analyse, interpret and explain the relations between cultural phenomena -particularly religious and political– by situating them in precise social and historical contexts.

Commitments

Löwy is linked to the Revolutionary Marxist current in France, and one of his last books, on Che Guevara, was written in collaboration with Olivier Besancenot, presidential candidate of the LCR (French Revolutionary Communist League), a Trotskyist party linked to the Fourth International. He is a member of the association ATTAC, of the Copernicus Foundation and of Espaces Marx. He has kept intense political contacts in Brazil.

He cooperated with left currents of the Brazilian Workers' Party (PT) for several years  but during recent years his main contact has been with the Brazilian Landless Workers Movement (MST), to whom he gave the money of the Prize Sergio Buarque de Hollanda which he received in 2000 for his book The war of Gods. Nowadays Löwy supports Socialism and Liberty Party (PSOL), a left dissidence of PT.

Löwy has taken part in the World Social Forum since the beginning, where he has presented several papers, one of which was in collaboration with the Brazilian liberation theologian Frei Betto. More recently, Löwy joined the struggle for ecosocialism; co-author, with Joel Kovel, of the International Ecosocialist Manifesto, he was also one of the organizers of the First Ecosocialist International Meeting in Paris (2007).

Interested since his youth by Surrealism—he met the poet Benjamin Péret during a visit in Paris in 1958—Löwy joined the Paris Surrealist Group, by invitation of Vincent Bounoure, its main organizer since 1969. Two of his books are devoted to Surrealism, in its utopian and revolutionary dimension.

Publications
 The Marxism of Che Guevara, New York, Monthly Review Press,  1973. (Second Edition :  Rowman and Littlefield,   2007.
 "Marxism and Revolutionary Romanticism". Telos 49 (Fall 1981). New York: Telos Press.
 Georg Lukács: from Romanticism to Bolchevism, London, Verso,  1981.
 The politics of combined and uneven development. The theory of permanent revolution,  London, Verso Books, 1981.
 Redemption and Utopia.  Libertarian Judaism in Central Europe, Stanford University Press, 1992.
 Marxism in Latin America from 1909 to the Present,  New Jersey,  Humanities Press,   1992.
 On Changing the World. Essays in political philosophy: from Karl Marx to Walter Benjamin, New Jersey, Humanities Press, 1993.  (Also in Japanese and Persian).
 The war of gods. Religion and Politics in Latin America,  London,  Verso,  1996.
 Fatherland or Mother Earth?  Essays on the national question,  London,  Pluto Press,  1998.
 Morning Star. Surrealism, Marxism, Anarchism, Situationism, Utopia,  Austin, University of Texas Press, 2000.
 Romanticism against the Tide of Modernity (with Robert  Sayre), Durham, Duke University Press,  2001.
 Joel Kovel and Michael Löwy (2002), "Manifeste écosocialiste international".
 Franz Kafka, rêveur insoumis, Paris, Editions Stock,  2004.
 Fire Alarm. Reading Walter Benjamin’s ‘On the Concept of History' , London,  Verso,  2005.
 The Theory of Revolution in the Young Marx, Leiden/Boston, Brill,   2003.
 Che Guevara, une braise qui brûle encore,  with Olivier Besancenot, Paris, Mille et une nuits, 2007.
 Michael Löwy, "Why Ecosocialism: For a Red-Green Future", Great Transition Initiative (December 2018).

References

 Richard Wolin, "A Metaphysical Materialist", The Nation, October 16, 2006, p. 30-35.

External links

 All Michael Löwy's articles (french language) on La Brèche Numérique
 Interview with Néstor Kohan
 Europe Solidaire   Includes many of his articles in French and English.
 Michael Löwy, a collection of his writings in International Viewpoint
 Franz Kafka and Libertarian Socialism by Michael Löwy
 TrotskyanaNet provides a biographical sketch and a selective bibliography on Michael Löwy.
 An ecosocialist manifesto by Joel Kovel and Michael Lowy on Ozleft
 Che Guevara: The Spark that does not Die by Michael Löwy, July 1997

1938 births
20th-century social scientists
20th-century French scientists
20th-century French writers
21st-century social scientists
21st-century French writers
Anti-consumerists
20th-century Brazilian Jews
Brazilian anti-capitalists
Brazilian emigrants to France
Brazilian people of Austrian-Jewish descent
Brazilian Marxists
French National Centre for Scientific Research scientists
Ecosocialists
French male writers
French sociologists
French Trotskyists
Jewish philosophers
Jewish socialists
Living people
New Anticapitalist Party politicians
University of Paris alumni
Academic staff of the University of Paris
Academic staff of Paris 8 University Vincennes-Saint-Denis
Marxist theorists
People from São Paulo
Research directors of the French National Centre for Scientific Research